Ioannis Tsangaridis (1887–1939) was a Greek Cypriot General of the Hellenic Army.

He was born in Lapithos in then British-ruled Cyprus, to Christophis Tsangaridis, in 1887. In 1904 he went to Athens for studies in chemistry, but quickly abandoned them and volunteered for the armed bands of the Macedonian Struggle (1904–08). On his return he enlisted in the Hellenic Army, and, after studies at the NCO School, was commissioned as a cavalry officer. 

He took part in the Balkan Wars, World War I, and the subsequent Asia Minor Campaign that followed. He distinguished himself at the Battle of the Sakarya where he was heavily wounded in August 1921, forcing him to take an extended leave. Promoted to Major General in 1935, he disagreed with the establishment of the dictatorial Metaxas Regime in 1936, leading to his internal exile in Sifnos and Ikaria. His lingering wounds, coupled with the hardships of exile, led to his death on 31 March 1939.

His brother Theofanis (1895–1962) took part in the 1931 Cyprus revolt and was exiled, going to Athens where he became president of the Cypriot community, while the youngest brother, Odysseas, became an architect in his home town of Lapithos.

His diary has been published in 1987 by the Estia bookshop as Το ημερολόγιο ενός στρατηγού: Σελίδες νεοελληνικής ιστορίας ("The Diary of a General: Pages of Modern Greek History").

References 

1880s births
1939 deaths
Hellenic Army major generals
People from Kyrenia District
Greek military personnel of the Balkan Wars
Greek military personnel of World War I
Greek military personnel of the Greco-Turkish War (1919–1922)
Greek people of the Macedonian Struggle
Prisoners and detainees of Greece